Rapid Eye Movement is the third studio album by progressive rock/metal band Riverside. It was released internationally by InsideOut Music on October 9, 2007, on September 28 in Europe by InsideOut Music and on September 24 by Mystic Productions in Poland.

Background 
Rapid Eye Movement is the final installment of the Reality Dream Trilogy which has thus far included Out of Myself and Second Life Syndrome. The album is split into two parts, entitled "Fearless" (tracks 1-5) and "Fearland" (tracks 6-9), respectively.

A two CD Digipack version of the album had also been released and includes extra tracks and some video footage. There are also two outtakes from the last Reality Dream Suite, the title track and "Reality Dream IV". Instead, both are included in the bonus disk, and the final instrumental suite is titled "Lucid Dream IV".

The album was named as one of  Classic Rock‘s 10 essential progressive rock albums of the decade.

In 2009, Century Media Records Ltd., under exclusive license from InsideOut Music, released a 2CD version including the bonus disk originally included in the 2007 Digipak version, without the video footage.

Track listing 
All lyrics are written by Mariusz Duda; all music is written by Riverside, except a portion of bonus track "Back to the River," which is an excerpt of Shine On You Crazy Diamond by Pink Floyd.

Personnel 
 Mariusz Duda – vocals, bass, acoustic guitar
Piotr Grudziński – guitars
 Michał Łapaj – keyboards
 Piotr Kozieradzki – drums

Charts

References

External links
kvltsite.com review

2007 albums
Concept albums
Inside Out Music albums
Mystic Production albums
Riverside (band) albums